Frederick Lincoln "Dick" Ashworth (24 January 1912 – 3 December  2005) was a United States Navy officer who served as the weaponeer on the B-29 Bockscar that dropped a Fat Man atomic bomb  on Nagasaki, Japan on 9 August 1945 during World War II.

A 1933 graduate of the United States Naval Academy at Annapolis, Maryland, Ashworth commanded Torpedo Squadron Eleven (VT-11), a Grumman TBF Avenger unit based on Guadalcanal that flew patrol, search, spotting, strike, and night mine-laying missions in support of the New Georgia Campaign in the Solomon Islands. He was awarded the Distinguished Flying Cross for heroism while carrying out these missions. He then participated in the Gilbert and Marshall Islands campaign as aviation officer on the staff of Vice Admiral Richmond K. Turner's V Amphibious Force.

Rotated back to the United States in June 1944, Ashworth became senior naval aviator at the Naval Proving Ground in Dahlgren, Virginia. In November 1944 he was assigned to the Manhattan Project, and supervised the  testing of atomic bomb components at Wendover. In February 1945, he travelled to Guam, where he met Fleet Admiral Chester Nimitz, and selected Tinian as a base of operations for the 509th Composite Group. After the war he selected Bikini Atoll as the site for Operation Crossroads.

Remaining in the navy after the war, Ashworth rose to the rank of vice admiral in May 1966. He was Commandant of Midshipmen at the United States Naval Academy in 1958, and served as commander of the United States Sixth Fleet from September 1966 to April 1967. He retired from the navy in 1968, and died in 2005.

Early life
Frederick Lincoln "Dick" Ashworth was born in  Beverly, Massachusetts on 24 January 1912, the third child of Fred Ashworth, who worked as a draughtsman and tool designer for the United Shoe Machinery Corporation, and his wife Minnie. He had two older brothers, Phil and Bentley. Phil graduated from the United States Naval Academy at Annapolis, Maryland, in 1931, but died in a 1938 seaplane crash off Pearl Harbor.

The family moved to a farmhouse in Wenham, Massachusetts, in 1918. Ashworth attended Center School in Wenham, and then, as Wenham had no high school of its own, Beverly High School, where he was president of the Student Council. Too young and small for football, he participated in track and cross country running. He graduated in 1928, and then entered Dartmouth College.

Ashworth decided that he wanted to go to Annapolis like his brother. He sat and passed the examinations for an appointment from his local Congressman, but did not secure one of the Congressman's two appointments. However, in August 1929, he was informed that one of the Congressman's appointments had been rejected for defective teeth. Ashworth then entered Annapolis. He graduated 134th in the class of 1933, and was commissioned as an ensign.

Naval career

Solomon Islands

Ashworth's first posting was to the battleship . He married Nathalie Louise (Nan) Bliss from Peabody, Massachusetts in June 1935. They had three sons: Frederick Jr., David and Stephen. In 1936, he was accepted for aviator training, and reported to the Pensacola Naval Air Station. He then held various positions including air photography officer for the United States Pacific Fleet. In 1939, he volunteered for postgraduate study at Annapolis as an aviation ordinance engineer.

By the time Ashworth graduated in June 1942, the United States had entered World War II. He became commander of Torpedo Squadron Eleven (VT-11), a Grumman TBF Avenger unit based on Guadalcanal.  VT-11 pilots flew patrol, search, spotting, strike, and night mine-laying missions in support of the New Georgia Campaign in the Solomon Islands. Ashworth was awarded the Distinguished Flying Cross and the Bronze Star Medal. His Distinguished Flying Cross citation read: 

In September 1943, Ashworth was posted to the staff of Vice Admiral Richmond K. Turner's V Amphibious Force as aviation officer. In this capacity he served in the Gilbert and Marshall Islands campaign.

Project Alberta

In June 1944, Ashworth was rotated back to the United States, where he became senior naval aviator at the Naval Proving Ground in Dahlgren, Virginia. In November he was assigned to the Manhattan Project. He later recalled that 

Holding the rank of commander, he became Director of Operations for Project Alberta, the portion of the Manhattan Project tasked with dropping of the weapons on Japan. In February 1945, Ashworth was sent to Guam to deliver a letter to Fleet Admiral Chester Nimitz from Fleet Admiral Ernest King ordering him to provide whatever support the Manhattan Project required. Ashworth's first task was to select a suitable base area for the 509th Composite Group. After looking at Guam and Saipan, he decided that Tinian would be more suitable, as it was closer to Japan than Guam, and had better facilities than Saipan. At the suggestion of island commander, Brigadier General Frederick V. H. Kimble, Ashworth selected an area at the northern end of the island.

The Director of the Manhattan Project,  Major General Leslie R. Groves, Jr., wanted each nuclear strike mission to be commanded by a "weaponeer", a Project Alberta service academy graduate who would fly on the bomb-carrying aircraft and make such tactical decisions as were required. Only two officers met this requirement: Ashworth and his commanding officer, Captain William S. Parsons. The two therefore agreed that they would flying alternating missions. Parsons therefore commanded the Hiroshima mission, while Ashworth commanded the Nagasaki mission. For this mission, Ashworth was awarded the Silver Star Medal. His citation read:

He was also awarded the Legion of Merit. His citation read: 

Ashworth was awarded a second Legion of Merit for Operation Crossroads in 1946. His citation read:

Post-war career
Ashworth remained in the navy after the war. He served on the staff of the Atomic Energy Commission's Division of Military Applications from 1952 to 1954. He was Commandant of Midshipmen at the United States Naval Academy in 1958, and headed the Atomic Energy Division for the Chief of Naval Operations from 1958 to 1960.

Promoted to vice admiral in May 1966, Ashworth served as commander of the United States Sixth Fleet from September 1966 to April 1967, for which he was awarded a Navy Distinguished Service Medal. From April 1967 to September 1968, he was Deputy Commander in Chief, U.S. Atlantic Fleet, and as chief of staff to the Commander in Chief Atlantic, Commander in Chief U.S. Atlantic Fleet and Commander in Chief Western Atlantic Area, for which he was awarded a second Navy Distinguished Service Medal. He retired in September 1968 with the rank of vice admiral.

Retirement
Frederick L. Ashworth lived for over three decades in Santa Fe, New Mexico. He and his first wife divorced in 1990, and he remarried. He died on  3 December 2005 at Arizona Heart Hospital in Phoenix, Arizona, while undergoing heart surgery,  and was buried in the Santa Fe National Cemetery. He was survived by his second wife, Ercie Bell Ashworth, and his sons Frederick Jr., David and Stephen.

Decorations

Notes

Further reading

External links

 MPHPA Classic picture gallery – VADM Frederick Ashworth 
Frederick L. Ashworth Oral History, 2016 MS 30 held by Special Collections & Archives, Nimitz Library at the United States Naval Academy

1912 births
2005 deaths
People from Beverly, Massachusetts
Manhattan Project people
United States Naval Academy alumni
United States Navy vice admirals
United States Navy personnel of World War II
Recipients of the Navy Distinguished Service Medal
Recipients of the Silver Star
Recipients of the Legion of Merit
Recipients of the Distinguished Flying Cross (United States)
People associated with the atomic bombings of Hiroshima and Nagasaki
Military personnel from Massachusetts